Zafarabad (also Romanized as Z̧afarābād) is a village in Nurabad Rural District, in the Central District of Delfan County, Lorestan Province, Iran. At the 2006 census, its population was 716, in 169 families.

References 

Towns and villages in Delfan County